The 1919 Waldeck state election was held on 9 March 1919 to elect 21  Constituent State Repesentatives of the Free State of Waldeck-Pyrmont. It was the only election conducted in the unified state before Pyrmont was detached and made part of the Free State of Prussia on 30 November 1921.

Results

References 

1919 elections in Germany
1919